Rusape is a town in Zimbabwe.

Location
It is located in Makoni District in Manicaland Province, in northeastern Zimbabwe.

Overview
Rusape is a large, sprawling town that has not quite reached city status. As is typical of Zimbabwean towns, Rusape has areas of low and high density population. The main high density area close to the town is Vengere township. Other suburbs have also been built since Independence in 1980. Mabvazuva to the east of town, and Tsanzaguru further out by the lakeside. Mabvazuva literally translates to "where the sun rises" (the East). There is also a new fast growing medium density suburb far east sprawling into the farmlands which is called Magamba Township. Tsanzaguru is home to much of Rusape's golden history. The name Tsanzaguru is derived from the Rozvi meaning of a big, rocky and tall hill from which the Rozvi were known to have wanted to build to the moon from there. They are said to have wanted to bring the moon to the King's Zunde Ramambo as a gift. It is from this background that all Chiefs countrywide have their badges designed in a circular form resembling the circular dream moon that the Rozvi wanted to bring their King. Typically noticeable in the surrounding region are the kopjes, msasa trees, occasional tobacco farms and the sometimes densely crowded rural resettlement villages.

Rusape's main piped water supply is from the purpose-built Rusape Dam, which was built on the Rusape River. The river runs in a northwest to southeast direction on the town outskirts. It is such a big river that the dam was planned with the eastern lowveld sugar-growing areas in mind. Ideally, Rusape dam was to be a reservoir for irrigation in areas deep down around Triangle and Chiredzi since it pours out into the Save River to the semi-arid regions.

History
Rusape was derived from rusapwe which means "may it never dry", with reference to the ever-flowing waters of the Rusape River, adjacent to the town. Because there are no other perennial streams in its vicinity, it would be a disaster if the river dried. The settlement began in 1894 with the establishment of a British South Africa Company post on the Rusape River.  A village grew around the post and, during the First Chimurenga in 1896, the village was attacked by Chief Mangwende.  At Gwindingwi, during the early days, Chief Chingaira Makoni was beheaded by the British in front of his subjects after his death by firing squad and his head taken to England.

Climate

Population
The town of Rusape has expanded southward, to include the high density area of Vengere and northward to include the low density development known as Silverbow. According to the 1982 Population Census, the town had a population of 8,216. This rose to 13,920 in 1992. In 2004, the population of Rusape was estimated at 29,292. The National Population Census of 2012 in Zimbabwe recorded a population of 30,316 for the town on 17 Augustus 2012. Former Zimbabwean Cricketer Kevin Curran hails from Rusape.

Education
The list of schools in Rusape include the following:
 Primary Schools
 Mount Carmel Primary School
John Cowie Primary School
 St Joseph's Primary School
 Tsanzaguru Primary School
 Vengere Primary School
 Rujeko Primary School
Highveld Primary School
 Mabvazuva Primary School
 Manda Primary School
 Madzingidzi Primary School
 Yorkshere Primary School
 St David's Gunda Primary School

 Secondary/High Schools
 Vengere High School
 St Joseph's Secondary School
 Tsanzaguru Secondary School
 Tsindi Secondary School
St Faith's High School
 Kriste Mambo High School
 St. Killians High School
 Nyakuipa Secondary School

 Colleges
 Destiny College
 Watermark College
 Three Hills College
 Vision College
 Ashanti Dzaro

Religion  
The number of churches in Rusape indicates the importance of religion in the community. Christianity appears to be the dominant religion, but African religions persist in and through various Christian denominations. Christianity and indigenous religions have influenced each other from the time missionaries first arrived in Rusape in the early 1900s. Anglican Canon, Edgar Lloyd, presided over St Faiths Mission,  from Rusape, from 1903 to 1936.

Places of worship

Christian 
 Apostolic Faith Mission Church – Nyanga Road
 Celebration Church – Nyanga Road
 Dutch Reformed Church – Nyanga Road
 Emmaus Zimbabwe (Catholic) – Unknown
 Grace Fellowship Church – Nyanga Drive
 One Church - Magamba Extension
 Rusape Community Church (Methodist) – Chingaira Street
 See End Time Message – Mabvazuva Road
 Seventh Day Adventist Church – Rusape (Castle Base Road); Vengere; Dana
 St Bartholomew Anglican Church (Anglican)– Chimoio Avenue
 St Johns Rusape United Methodist Church - Vengere
 St Simon Stock (Catholic)– Nyabadza Avenue
 Watchtower Kingdom Hall – Castle Base Road

Hindu 
 Rusape Hindu Hall – Nyanga Road

Jewish 
 Jews of Rusape
 Temple of Beth El of the Church of God and the Saints of God - unknown

Muslim 
 Mosque – Vengere Road

THE GOSPEL OF GOD CHURCH

Is located in the Gandanzara area near Dziruni shops on a hilltop called Dandadzi, the church was founded by Johane Masowe And was established in 1932.

See also
 Districts of Zimbabwe
 Provinces of Zimbabwe

References

Makoni District
Populated places in Manicaland Province